Almaz Monasypov (1925–2008) was a composer of Tatar origin. He was an art worker of the Russian Soviet Federative Socialist Republic (1987), People's Artist of the Tatarstan Republic (2000), and laureate of the State Prize of the Republic of Tatarstan named after Gabdulla Tuqay (1991). He is one of the first Tatar composers to re-embodied in modern music the ancient layers of the national tradition like baits, munajats, and book singing. The Symphony-poem "Musa Jalil" (Symphony II) and the vocal-symphonic poem "In the rhythms of Tuqay" are recognized as Tatar national musical classics.

Life and career 

Almaz Monasypov was born on 11 July 1925 in Kazan. His family often played music and his father loved to play the violin. At the age of eleven, Monasypov entered the children's music school in Kazan to learn to play the cello. His teacher at the music school, and then at the Kazan Music College was Ruvim Polyakov, who helped the young Monasypov to believe in his musical talent.

In 1943, Monasypov turned 18 and was subsequently drafted into the Red Army. He became a soldier in the Eastern Front. After the end of the war, Monasypov  returned to his studies. He entered the Kazan state Conservatory, where he graduated in 1950 as a cellist in the class of Professor Alexander Brown. He returned to the Conservatory in 1952 to study composition. In 1956, he graduated from the Kazan Conservatory for the second time in the class of Professor Albert Leman and received a diploma as a composer. In 1964, Monasypov completed a full course of post-graduate studies at the Conservatory in the specialty of opera and symphony conducting in the class of Professor Isay Sherman.

From 1959 to 1970, Monasypov worked as a conductor at the Tatar State Opera and Ballet House named after Mussa Jalil. From 1970 to 1973, Monasypov  was the conductor of the Symphony orchestra of the Tatar State Philharmonic named after G. Tuqay. From 1968 to 1973 and from 2000 to 2003 he taught at the Kazan Conservatory at the Department of composition.

Starting in 1972, Monasypov lived in Moscow but actively participated in the musical life of the Republic of Tatarstan, in the work of the Union of Composers of Tatarstan and in the education of young composers. In 1991, he was awarded The State prize of the Republic of Tatarstan named after G. Tuqay. His music is often heard from the concert stage, on radio and television, recorded on records and CDs.

Monasypov died on 22 July 2008 in Moscow and was buried at the Mitinsky cemetery, Moscow, Russia.

Music 
The composer clearly showed himself in the genre of symphony addressed to music-erudite listeners.

Symphony-poem "Musa Jalil" 
Dedicated to the famous Tatar poet-hero, The Symphony-poem "Musa Jalil" (also Second Symphony, 1971), brought great success to Monasypov. Vividly embodying images of courage and heroism, war and the enemy in the Symphony, the poem invites listeners to think about important issues of human life, to keep the memory of war heroes forever and to protect the world.

Symphony III (1974) 
In the Third Symphony (1974), the composer continues the philosophical theme of man's search for his place in the world, shows the complexity and necessity of resisting cruelty and violence. In the music of the Symphony, the SOS signal is interestingly encrypted. The rhythm of the SOS signal breaks through at the climax zones of the development of the theme, when the theme seems to start "screaming" for help.

Symphony IV "Dastan"(1978) 
The Fourth Symphony "Dastan" (1978) is an example of Tatar symphonic music, in which ancient layers of centuries-old Tatar culture "come to life". Monasypov always turned to the intonations and rhythms of ancient baits and munajats, including them in his instrumental and vocal compositions. The search for new means of displaying the spiritual world of Tatar culture has always been carried out by the composer in the context of modern trends in world professional music, taking into account new trends in the development of composing techniques.

Other works 
While also primarily creating more serious pieces of music, Monasypov is at the same time widely known as the author of many popular songs and romances that are loved by listeners not only in Republic Tatarstan, but also far beyond its borders. His compositions are also performed by pop orchestras. For example, the Foxtrot "Hallar" ("Dreams") was included in the repertoire of famous jazz orchestra under Oleg Lundstrem. One of the most famous works was the vocal-symphonic poem "In the rhythms of Tuqay" written in 1975. It is interesting to combine the traditions of ancient munajats, modern pop songs and European vocal and symphonic music. In 1990, "Musical offering to Salih Saidashev" was written for the Symphony orchestra, in which the author pays homage to the founder of Soviet Tatar professional music.

Works 

 "In the rhythms of Tuqay" (1974);
 Symphonies I – IV (1963, 1968, 1974, 1978);
 "Musical offering to Salih Saidashev" (1990);
 "Kryashen melodies" (1998);
 Incidental music for plays;
 more than 300 songs and romances with Tatar and Russian lyrics;
 chamber music:
 Violin sonata (1954)
 pieces for instruments solo

Articles 

 Монасыпов, А. Неразрывная связь: [воспоминания композитора о годах учебы в консерватории] // Казань. – 2005 – No. 5 – С. 18–19.
 Монасыпов, А. Как создать элиту. Оценки и прогнозы. Век ушедший и наступивший век. XX-XXI. // Казань. – 2001 – No. 2 – С. 71.
 Монасыпов, А. Неангажированный оптимист: [беседа с композитором накануне его юбилея] / Беседовала Т. Алмазова. // Республика Татарстан. – 2001 – 20 января.

Sources

References

External links 

 
 
 

Tatar people of Russia
20th-century classical composers
Tatar composers
Russian classical composers
Tatar people of the Soviet Union
Kazan Conservatory alumni
1925 births
2008 deaths
Soviet composers